The United Kingdom's Geospatial Commission is an expert group, established in 2018 as part of the Cabinet Office, responsible for promoting the use of geospatial data in the country.
The commission also defines UK's "geospatial strategy".

It works closely with its Partner Bodies,  also known as the Geo6:
 British Geological Survey
 Coal Authority
 HM Land Registry
 Ordnance Survey
 UK Hydrographic Office
 Valuation Office Agency

See also
Infrastructure for Spatial Information in the European Community

References

Cabinet Office (United Kingdom)
Geographic data and information organisations in the United Kingdom